Sudoeste de Goiás Microregion is a region in southwest Goiás state, Brazil. The largest towns are Jataí, Santa Helena de Goiás, and Rio Verde. It is watered by several important rivers, which are tributaries of the Paranaíba.

This is possibly the richest region of the state of Goiás and is a large producer of soybeans, corn, and cotton.  The relatively flat grassy plains are ideal for cattle grazing.  Several of the state's most prosperous cities are located here.

The most populous municipality is Rio Verde with 149,3821 inhabitants (2007).  The least populous is Aparecida do Rio Doce with 2,702 inhabitants (2007).

The largest municipality in area is Mineiros with 9,096.4 km2.  The smallest is Aparecida do Rio Doce with 290 km2.

Municipalities 
The microregion consists of the following municipalities:

See also
List of municipalities in Goiás
Microregions of Goiás

References

Microregions of Goiás